Lavocatavis is an extinct genus of phorusrhacoid or "terror bird" from the Eocene of Algeria. A fossilized femur was described from the Glib Zegdou Formation in 2011 and is the only known specimen of Lavocatavis. The species was designated L. africana.

Discovery and naming
The holotype of Lavocatavis, UM HGL 51-55, consists of an almost complete right femur. It is reasonably well preserved in the middle, but fragmentary at both ends. It originates from layer HGL 51 of the Glib Zegdou Formation of Algeria. The generic epithet (meaning "Lavocat's bird") was named in honor of René Lavocat, the person who first reported the earth layer of the holotype.

Paleobiogeography
The oldest phorusrhacoids are from South America and Antarctica, suggesting that the ancestors of Lavocatavis migrated into Africa from the west. During the Eocene, the Atlantic Ocean separated South America from Africa by at least , ruling out a land migration. For a flightless terrestrial bird like Lavocatavis, the only means of entering Africa would have been through rafting on floating islands or island hopping. Currents traveled westward in the South Atlantic during the early Paleocene, making it unlikely that phorusrhacoids traveled on floating islands. The ancestors of Lavocatavis most likely traveled between very large islands that existed on what are now the submerged Rio Grande Rise and Walvis Ridge. However, it is also possible that the ancestors of Lavocatavis retained some of their flight ability and were able to travel between islands with more ease than flightless birds. If this was the case, Lavocatavis became flightless independently of other flightless phorusrhacoids, in a case of convergent evolution.

References

Extinct flightless birds
Eocene birds
Fossil taxa described in 2011
Phorusrhacidae
Cenozoic birds of Africa